Musakhel, is a village and union council of Mianwali District in the Punjab province of Pakistan. It is part of Mianwali Tehsil and is located at 32°38'14N 71°44'20E.

Majority of the population belongs to Niazi tribes. The leading tribes include Yari Khel,Khalas Khel,Maddikhel,Sher Khel, Rami Khel, Khanjri Khel ,Rozi Khel ,Qalander Khel ,Akber Khel , Gulani Khel, Machar Khel,Baahi, Baggy khel,Dalili khel ,Dhedi ,Ghoruni  etc.Along with other niazi families also were Balochs who were always tout of super powers and helped others to hang and jail people of Musakhel.Likewise zeldar post was given to them to inforce brutality towards public.

Musakhel is famous for the shrine of Noori Naang Sultan Sahib, a very old and historic place. Other shrines present in this area are Sheikh Toss sahib and Sir-kapp sahib.
Religious personalities include syed Ghaus shah sahb, Shekh mahmood sahb and shekh usman sahb (baahi).
Notable personnel include Muhammad Nawaz Khan(Yari Khel),Ahmad Nawaz Khan(Nawaza Barbri) who was killed in a police encounter in 1993,Haji zameer khan(Yari Khel)Maullanah Kausur Niazi who was a tout of Bhutto ,Muhammad Nasrullah khan Niazi khalas khel(advocate),,Sufi bahadar khan yari khel,Superintendent Police Islamabad Habibullah Khan Khanjari Khel, Abdul karim khan khalas khel, Zafar Iqbal Khan Rami Khel, Defender of Pakistan, Lt. General Zarar Azeem khan Yari khel, Dr. Ajmal Nazi Luqi khel, Colonel(R). Mumtaz Khan Niazi khalas khel Officer Commandant Military Police and EX-DDG-IB RAWALPINDI, Session judge Muqarrab khan yari khel, Zarar Khan Niazi Khalas Khel Director of Metro politian College Australia, Nawaz Khan Fateh Khan Khel ETO Excise, Ameer Abdul Rehman Khan Baahi Chairman JIP, Doctor Muhammad Khan MS DHQ and Guljana Niazi Vice Ambassador CNLP, Zubair Ahmed Khan Niazi PTI leader, Saleem Ullah Khan Niazi Qalander khel social activist settled in United Kingdom. All these notables were loyal and serving to the community and locals of area and only these notables never took bribe or hurt anyone.
The history nominates the famous General and Waali of Paktia (governor) province in Afghanistan Musa Khan Niazi (Ghilzai-Paktia) at the time period of Mirwais Hotak (1673–1715) during the Hotak empire. Hotaks belonged to Kandhar and in recent days their most populated place is Paktia province. Hotak empire shifted to Durrani empire in 1747 and continued till Barakzai (Durrani) last king Muhammad Zahir shah (1747-1973).The land of Musakhel was originally belonged to the (Gakhar) tribe but later was captured by the descendants of Musa khan.

Regarding Musa Khan Niazi who showed his bravery in many wars against enemies in sub-continent . They were the first Niazai's tribal warriors which were settled in between mountains coming from all the way from Paktia to Mianwali Musakhel. Musa Khan Niazai had 9 sons (Murad Khan, Ahmad Khan, Khadar Khan, Jhaandi Khan, Asnan Khan, Boya Khan, Shado Khan, Kandi Khan, Daad Khan). Considering all of them Ahmad Khan had the most number of descendants including 5-6 main tribes.

The Wahhi graveyard of Musakhel is considered as the most ancient graveyard in Asia in a better look up-till today. The people are generous and very polite. They are the ancient Ghilzai tribe people which has produced many Nobel personalities both in Pakistan and Afghanistan.
Famous games of musakhel are kabbadi, volley ball and hockey.
Most famous dish of Musakhel is its pulao. "Musakhel ka pulao" is highly appreciated in whole of Mianwali.

References

Union councils of Mianwali District
Populated places in Mianwali District